Jablanac is a village in Lika-Senj County, Croatia, located on the Adriatic Sea underneath the Velebit mountain, overlooking the island of Rab. The village used to have a ferry port that connected it to Rab, but that moved up the coast to Stinica in July 2012. The population of Jablanac is 83 (2011) and it is located in the municipality of Senj (which lies to the north).

Local attractions include Zavratnica inlet where you can see a sunken military ferry wreck from WW2 and stunning scenery. Nearby is the Velebit mountain and the Northern Velebit National Park.

References

External links

www.Jablanac.com 

Populated places in Lika-Senj County